The 1982–83 Minnesota North Stars season was the North Stars' 16th season.

Coached by Glen Sonmor (22–12–9) and Murray Oliver (18–12–7), the team compiled a record of 40–24–16 for 96 points, to finish the regular season 2nd in the Norris Division. In the playoffs they won the division semi-finals 3–1 over the Toronto Maple Leafs, but lost the division finals 4–1 to the Chicago Black Hawks.

Offseason

NHL Draft
In the summer of 1982, General Manager Lou Nanne orchestrated one of the franchise's biggest moves ever, and landed a star in the making, by drafting highly coveted Brian Bellows. It paid immediate dividends, as he would score 35 goals in his rookie campaign, and helped the team to finish with 40 wins and 96 regular season points - both the most ever recorded in the 26 years the franchise was based in Minnesota. Once again, though, the North Stars fell in the playoffs to the pesky Denis Savard and Al Secord-led Chicago Black Hawks in the second round of the playoffs.

Regular season

Final standings

Schedule and results

Player statistics

Forwards
Note: GP = Games played; G = Goals; A = Assists; Pts = Points; PIM = Penalty minutes

Defencemen
Note: GP = Games played; G = Goals; A = Assists; Pts = Points; PIM = Penalty minutes

Goaltending
Note: GP = Games played; W = Wins; L = Losses; T = Ties; SO = Shutouts; GAA = Goals against average

Playoffs

Awards and records

References
 North Stars on Hockey Database

Minnesota North Stars seasons
Minnesota North Stars
Minnesota North Stars
Minnesota Twins
Minnesota Twins